A Greek festival or Greek Fest is an annual celebration of Greek culture presented by many ethnic Greek American communities and organization in the United States and Canada, particularly Greek Orthodox churches. Typically, these events are intended for attendance by the general public.  Attendees can sample Greek music, cuisine, and dance, typically performed in traditional dress. Such events are often fundraisers for Orthodox churches of the Greek Archdiocese. These Greek festivals originate from celebrations in Greece for religious holidays, such as, Greek Orthodox Easter and non-religious holidays, such as, the Festival of Flowers (Protomayia).

Greek foods often served at Greek festivals include Lamb, Greek salad with olives and Feta cheese, Dolmades, Spanakopita, Tiropita, and Greek Coffee. Sweets include Baklava, Loukoumades, Diples, Galaktoboureko, Koulorakia, and Kourabiedes. 

In a modern context, the term "Greek Fest" is also used to refer to the celebrations or festivities organized and held by college/university fraternities and sororities (Greek system organizations) in North America.

See also
 Athenian festivals, for a list of festivals celebrated in ancient Greece.

External links
http://www.yasas.com/greek/festivals/usa/

Greek culture
Greek-American culture
Greek-Australian culture
Greek-Canadian culture
Greek-New Zealand culture
Greek festivals
Cultural festivals in the United States
Cultural festivals in Canada